Nodlandsvatnet is a lake in the municipality of Eigersund in Rogaland county, Norway.

The lake also serves a recreational function. The Opplev Dalane (Explore Dalane) hiking path runs past the lake, and an open hut for hikers opened in December 2007 at Imeseid. The lake also has a sandy beach.

See also
List of lakes in Norway

References

Eigersund
Lakes of Rogaland
Reservoirs in Norway